Apatides is a genus of horned powder-post beetles in the family Bostrichidae. There are at least four described species in Apatides.

Species
These four species belong to the genus Apatides:
 Apatides fortis (LeConte, 1866) (horned powderpost beetle)
 Apatides pollens Casey
 Apatides puncticeps Casey
 Apatides robustus Casey

References

Further reading

 
 
 

Bostrichidae
Articles created by Qbugbot